The British Liberation Army (BLA) was the official name given to the British Army forces which fought on the Western Front of the Second World War, between the Invasion of Normandy and the end of the war. Almost all BLA units were assigned to the 21st Army Group, which also included forces from other countries.

Following the war the BLA was redesignated to become the British Army of the Rhine (BAOR) in August 1945.

References

Military units and formations of the British Army in World War II
Western European theatre of World War II